Grażyna Wojcieszko (born 14 September 1957 in Bydgoszcz, Poland) is a Polish poet, author of collections: W oczekiwaniu (Estrella, 2000), Karuzela (Księgarnia Akademicka, 2005), Les abattoirs de Bruxelles (Księgarnia Akademicka, 2008) and Sen o Tramwaju (Księgarnia Akademicka, 2012). The collection Les abattoirs de Bruxelles qualified for the Silesius 2008, a Polish Poetry Award; the collection was translated into French by Alain van Crugten, and published in 2011; poems were also translated into Swedish by Jurek Hirschberg and published in SueciaPolonia.

The poet took part in several international poetry festivals such as Polish days at Saint Gilles in Brussels, Belgium (2011), and Poetry Spring in Luxembourg (2012), Poetry Night in Chojnice, Poland (2011), 15th anniversary of the 'Artistic Literary Studies’ at the Jagiellonian University, Cracow, Poland (2009), 5th and 6th edition of the Bydgoszcz Literary Triangle, Bydgoszcz, Poland (2007, 2008).

She created with the musician Adam Prucnal a poetry event, a mix of music and poetry, which they are performing all over the world.

University diplomas 
2005 Jagiellonian University Cracow, Poland, Faculty of Polish Studies, (Artistic Literary Studies); 1987 University Paris 6, France, (Artificial Intelligence);  1985 University Paris 11, France (Computer Science), 1981 Academy of Technology and Agriculture, Bydgoszcz, Poland (Telecommunication).

1985–1990: Assistant, Department of Computer Science, École centrale Paris, France
1989–1990: Scholarship, Department of Computer Science, University of California, Berkeley, USA
1990–1992: Expert, International Cooperation, European Commission, Brussels, Belgium
1992–2016: Project Manager, European Commission, Brussels, Belgium

Bibliography
 Mężczyzna w zielonych spodniach (Czerwona Papuga, Warszawa 2014), collective works, stories
 The tram dream (Księgarnia Akademicka, Kraków 2013), a collection
 Sen o tramwaju (Księgarnia Akademicka, Kraków 2013), audiobook
 Sen o tramwaju (Księgarnia Akademicka, Kraków 2012), a collection
 Poeci Borów Tucholskich (Miejska Biblioteka Publiczna w Tucholi, Tuchola 2012), collective works, poems
 Les abattoirs de Bruxelles (Księgarnia Akademicka, Kraków 2011) A collection 
 Almanach IV Bronowickiego karnawału Literackiego (Klub Kultury Mydlniki, Kraków 2009), collective works, poems
 Rzeźnie Brukselskie(Księgarnia Akademicka, Kraków 2008), a collection
 Nie damy pogrześć mowy (Edition APAJTE, Paryż 2008), collective works, poems
 Miłość niejedno ma imię (Miejski Domu Kultury "Południe", 2007), collective works, poems
 Podróż Poetycka (EX LIBRIS 43bis, Katowice 2007), collective works, poems
 Cząstki języka (Miejska Biblioteka Publiczna, Nowa Ruda 2007), collective works, poems
 Karuzela (Księgarnia Akademicka, Kraków 2005), a collection
 Pretekst (Księgarnia Akademicka, Kraków 2005), collective works, poems
 W oczekiwaniu (Estrella, Warszawa 2000), a collection

References

External links

1957 births
Living people
21st-century Polish poets
Polish women poets
21st-century Polish women writers
Writers from Bydgoszcz